Vincenzo Voce (born 5 April 1962 in Crotone) is an Italian politician.

He ran for Mayor of Crotone at the 2020 Italian local elections, supported by the civic list Tesoro Calabria (Treasure Calabria) and other civic parties. He was elected at the second round with 63.95% and took office on 7 October 2020. On 27 March 2021, as a stand against 'intolerance, verbal and physical violence, and racism', Voce gave honorary citizenship of the city to the son of Crotone's Simeon Nwankwo after the Nigerian footballer was subject to cyber racism, including wishes that his son die of pancreatic cancer.

See also
2020 Italian local elections
List of mayors of Crotone

References

External links
 

1962 births
Living people
Mayors of Crotone
People from Crotone